Zygmunt "Simon" Janczewski birth name ; 26 January 1926 – 5 January 1989) was a French professional footballer who played as a defender.

Honours 
Sochaux

 Coupe Charles Drago: 1953

Bordeaux

 Coupe de France runner-up: 1954–55

References 

1926 births
1989 deaths
Sportspeople from Reims
French footballers
French people of Polish descent
Association football defenders
FC Sochaux-Montbéliard players
FC Girondins de Bordeaux players
Ligue 1 players
Ligue 2 players
Footballers from Grand Est